The Best of the Pointer Sisters is the first compilation album released by the Pointer Sisters on the ABC/Blue Thumb record label in July 1976. It includes their biggest hits up to that point, such as "Yes We Can Can", "Fairytale", and "How Long". The album also included the new single "You Gotta Believe", which was produced by Norman Whitfield and featured in the 1976 film Car Wash and on its soundtrack.

Track listing

Charts

References

External links
 

1976 compilation albums
The Pointer Sisters albums
albums produced by Dave Rubinson
albums produced by Norman Whitfield
ABC Records compilation albums
Blue Thumb Records albums